The 2009 Hessian state election was held on 18 January 2009 to elect the members of the Landtag of Hesse. The election was called after the failure of all government formation attempts conducted after the 2008 state election held a year earlier. The Social Democratic Party (SPD) suffered major losses, falling from an effective tie with the Christian Democratic Union (CDU) to a 13.5-point deficit. The Free Democratic Party (FDP) and The Greens were the primary beneficiaries of the SPD's decline. After the election, the CDU formed a coalition government with the FDP, and Roland Koch was elected Minister-President.

Background
The result of the 2008 Hessian state election was inconclusive, as neither the CDU–FDP or SPD–Green blocs had won a majority. This was due to the entry of The Left into the Landtag, with which the SPD was unwilling to cooperate, though both The Left and Greens supported a red-red-green coalition between the three parties. While a grand coalition between the CDU and SPD would command a comfortable majority, this option was very unpopular and was rejected by the SPD.

In October 2008, SPD leader Andrea Ypsilanti attempted to negotiate a red-red-green coalition, reneging on a pledge made earlier in the year not to do so. This caused an revolt within the Hessian SPD, resulting in Ypsilanti being deposed and the new leadership under Thorsten Schäfer-Gümbel seeking fresh elections.

CDU leader Roland Koch had served as Minister-President prior to the 2008 election, and continued in office in a caretaker capacity between the 2008 and 2009 elections. He could not be unseated due to the inability of the SPD to form a new government; in Hesse, the motion to remove a serving government simultaneously invests confidence in a proposed new government, and requires an absolute majority to pass.

Parties
The table below lists parties represented in the previous Landtag of Hesse.

Opinion polling

Election result

|-
! colspan="2" | Party
! Votes
! %
! +/-
! Seats 
! +/-
! Seats %
|-
| bgcolor=| 
| align=left | Christian Democratic Union (CDU)
| align=right| 963,763
| align=right| 37.2
| align=right| 0.4
| align=right| 46
| align=right| 4
| align=right| 39.0
|-
| bgcolor=| 
| align=left | Social Democratic Party (SPD)
| align=right| 614,648
| align=right| 23.7
| align=right| 13.0
| align=right| 29
| align=right| 13
| align=right| 24.6
|-
| bgcolor=| 
| align=left | Free Democratic Party (FDP)
| align=right| 420,426
| align=right| 16.4
| align=right| 6.8
| align=right| 20
| align=right| 9
| align=right| 16.9
|-
| bgcolor=| 
| align=left | Alliance 90/The Greens (Grüne)
| align=right| 356,040
| align=right| 13.7
| align=right| 6.2
| align=right| 17
| align=right| 8
| align=right| 14.4
|-
| bgcolor=| 
| align=left | The Left (Linke)
| align=right| 139,074
| align=right| 5.4
| align=right| 0.3
| align=right| 6
| align=right| 0
| align=right| 5.1
|-
! colspan=8|
|-
| 
| align=left | Free Voters (FW)
| align=right| 42,153
| align=right| 1.6
| align=right| 0.7
| align=right| 0
| align=right| ±0
| align=right| 0
|-
| bgcolor=|
| align=left | Others
| align=right| 55,768
| align=right| 2.2
| align=right| 
| align=right| 0
| align=right| ±0
| align=right| 0
|-
! align=right colspan=2| Total
! align=right| 2,591,872
! align=right| 100.0
! align=right| 
! align=right| 118
! align=right| 8
! align=right| 
|-
! align=right colspan=2| Voter turnout
! align=right| 
! align=right| 61.0
! align=right| 3.3
! align=right| 
! align=right| 
! align=right| 
|}

References

2009 elections in Germany
2009